Hosur is a state assembly constituency in Krishnagiri district in Tamil Nadu, India. Its State Assembly Constituency number is 55. It consists of a portion of Hosur taluk. It forms a part of Krishnagiri Lok Sabha constituency for national elections to the Parliament of India. It is one of the 234 State Legislative Assembly Constituencies in Tamil Nadu, in India.

Madras State

Tamil Nadu

Election Results

2021

2019 By-election

2016

2011

2006

2001

1996

1991

1989

1984

1980

1977

1971

1967

1962

1957

1952

References 

 

Assembly constituencies of Tamil Nadu
Krishnagiri district